School for Secrets (also known as Secret Flight) is a 1946 British black-and-white film written and directed by Peter Ustinov and starring Ralph Richardson. In leading supporting roles were David Tomlinson, Raymond Huntley, Finlay Currie, Richard Attenborough, John Laurie and Michael Hordern. Based on a 1942 RAF training film for would-be 'boffins' and developed with the full cooperation of the Air Ministry, the film celebrates the discovery of radar, its discoverers and the enabling culture. Produced by Two Cities Films, it was shot at Denham Studios with sets designed by the art director Carmen Dillon.

Plot
School for Secrets tells the story of the "boffins" - research scientists - who discovered and developed radar and helped avoid the German invasion of Britain in 1940. Five scientists, led by Professor Heatherville (Ralph Richardson), are brought together to work in secrecy and under pressure to develop the device. Their dedication disrupts their family lives as they are forced to sacrifice everything to make a breakthrough. Their success is illustrated by the effect radar has on the fighting abilities of the RAF over the skies of Britain in the summer and autumn months of 1940. However, Germany is also planning its own radar capability and British commandos are dispatched to strike a German installation. The scientists complete their work just in time for the D-Day.

Messages
The film only represent events and characters in the most general way. It ostensibly celebrates the boffins, but C.P. Snow and the RAF come out of it well, particularly in the terms of recruitment, leadership,  the 'Sunday Soviets' and more generally collaboration between scientists of different backgrounds, between boffins and the services, and between the more technical officers and the more familiar 'officer and gentleman' types. The boffins with technically relevant specialities are represented as having technocratic tendencies, requiring careful handling. Solly Zuckermann is represented as a key character. As a zoologist he is a respected scientist who shares the initial ignorance of the RAF on electronics, and thus provides a vital bridge between cultures. Reference is made to his previous work on 'the social life of monkeys and apes'. The difference between German and British practice is well illustrated, where open bickering is more productive than sullen compliance. It is such aspects, rather than historical or technical details, that the film strives to put across.

Cast

 Ralph Richardson as Professor Heatherville 
 Raymond Huntley as Professor Laxton-Jones 
 John Laurie as Dr. McVitie 
 Ernest Jay as Dr. Dainty 
 David Tomlinson as Mr. Watlington 
 Finlay Currie as Sir Duncan Wills 
 Norman Webb as Dr. Wainwright 
 Michael Hordern as Lieutenant Commander Lowther 
 Pamela Matthews as Mrs. Watlington 
 Joan Haythorne as Mrs. Laxton-Jones 
 Joan Young as Mrs. McVitie 
 Ann Wilton as Mrs. Dainty 
 Richard Attenborough as Jack Arnold 
 Marjorie Rhodes as Mrs. Arnold
 David Hutcheson as Squadron Leader Sowerby 
 Patrick Waddington as Group Captain Aspinall
 Cyril Smith as Flight Sergeant Cox
 James Hayter as R.A.F. Technical Officer 
 Robert Wyndham as Commando Major
 Andrew Blackett as Commando Captain
 Bill Owen as Commando NCO
 Robin Bailey as Wives' Escort Officer
 Hugh Dempster as Sqdn. Ldr. Slatter
 Kenneth Milne-Buckley as Sqdn. Ldr. Buckley
 Paul Carpenter as Flt. Lt. Argylle
 Anthony Dawson as Flt. Lt. Norton
 Murray Matheson as Wing Cdr. Allen
 Peggy Evans as Daphne Adams
 Ingrid Forrest as 	Penelope Birkenshaw
 Geraldine Keyes as Phyllis Hammond
 Vida Hope as 	WAAF Flight Sergeant
 Edward Lexy as Sir Desmond Prosser
 Hugh Pryse as Sir Nicholas Hathaway
 O. B. Clarence as 	Old Retainer
 Aubrey Mallalieu as 1st Club Member
 Desmond Roberts as 2nd Club Member
 Guy Belmore as 3rd Club Member
 Joseph Almas as Dr. Klemmerhahn
 Arthur Rieck as Lt. Hense
 Ernest Urbank as	1st Sentry
 Karl Morel	as	2nd Sentry
 Kenneth More as 	Bomb Aimer

Critical reception
TV Guide wrote, "as would be expected from young writer-director Ustinov (he was 25 years old at the time), a nice sense of humour is integrated into the proceedings, a refreshing change from the deadly serious propaganda films that dominated the screen at the time. Unfortunately, portions of School for Secrets are too talky and tend to drag on past the point of interest, but the action scenes are excitingly handled and manage to keep the narrative aloft", while Britmovie called the film a "sprightly melodrama. With its starry cast of character actor and witty dialogue, Ustinov focuses more on the diverse characters than scientific advances."

References

External links

Review of film at Variety

1946 films
1946 war films
British black-and-white films
British war films
1940s English-language films
Films about scientists
Films directed by Peter Ustinov
Battle of Britain films
Films set in 1939
Films set in 1940
Films set in 1944
Films set in 1945
Films set in London
Films set in France
1946 directorial debut films
Films shot at Denham Film Studios
Two Cities Films films
1940s British films